Émile Campardon (18 July 1837 – 23 February 1915) was a French historian, archivist and writer. He was an archivist and head of the judicial section of the Archives nationales de France from 1857 to 1908, and the author of numerous books. At the beginning of the 20th century he published Quatrains and Souvenirs d’un archiviste. Intended for a circle of friends these extremely rare volumes contain amusing and impertinent portraits of archivists of the 19th century.

He is known above all for his four fundamental works on the history of the theatres of Paris:

 Les Spectacles de la foire, Paris, Berger-Levrault et Cie, 1877, 2 vols.
 Les Comédiens de la troupe française, Paris, H. Champion, 1879.
 Les Comédiens du roi de la troupe italienne, Paris, Berger-Levrault et Cie, 1880, 2 vols.
 L'Académie royale de musique au XVIIIe siècle, Paris, Berger-Levrault et Cie, 1884, 2 vols.

External links 
 Les Spectacles de la foire on the website CÉSAR 
 Works by Émile Campardon at Google Books

19th-century French historians
French archivists
1837 births
1915 deaths
École Nationale des Chartes alumni
French male non-fiction writers
Chevaliers of the Légion d'honneur
19th-century French male writers